Donald Wayne Hankins (February 9, 1902 – May 16, 1963) was a Major League Baseball pitcher who played for the Detroit Tigers in .

External links

1902 births
1963 deaths
Detroit Tigers players
Major League Baseball pitchers
Baseball players from Indiana
People from Pendleton, Indiana